Tigger & Pooh and a Musical Too is a 2009 American direct-to-video animated musical film produced by Walt Disney Television Animation, based on the hit Playhouse Disney series My Friends Tigger & Pooh. In the film, Darby, Tigger and Pooh make a musical concert for the Hundred Acre Wood.

The film, which is the second film of the series, was released on DVD on April 7, 2009. It first aired on Playhouse Disney less than a week later on April 11. Unlike the Super Sleuth Christmas Movie, it was treated more like a regular film than as part of the series.

Plot
In a plot similar to Singin' in the Rain, Rabbit is named the first mayor of the Hundred Acre Wood for his great effort on planning their best friends picnic. Unfortunately, when Darby says that a mayor is in charge of everything, this goes to his head and he makes up a lot of rules, like "No Bouncing", "No Honey" and everything is by a schedule. By and by everyone gets annoyed by the new rules and finally when everyone (especially Tigger) can't follow the rules, Rabbit and Beaver, who becomes the vice-mayor, decide to divide the wood so that Rabbit could be mayor on one side. They give Tigger a break of bouncing, but it doesn't work. They then decide that Rabbit and Tigger can be mayor.

They have Beaver draw a white line through the Hundred Acre Wood. The problem is that the white line separates the people on each side from their friends. Everyone, except Darby and Buster, is to stay on their side which results to problems and chaos. Tigger and Pooh can no longer sleuth, Roo and Lumpy can't visit each other, Tigger can no longer be friends with Roo and Rabbit, and goods, supplies and materials can't be traded (which means no thistles for Eeyore and no cookies made by Kanga). Rabbit sees the sadness and decides to cheer everyone up by having a picnic on his side and Tigger does the same. But the picnics are no fun due to everyone being separated until Darby hatches a plan to reunite the Hundred Acre Wood and have everything go back to normal, and it worked. Rabbit and Tigger, having seen the error of their ways, both step down from being mayor and order Beaver to remove the white line, restoring peace to the Hundred Acre Wood.

Voice cast

 Chloë Grace Moretz as Darby
 Dee Bradley Baker as Buster and Woodpecker
 Jim Cummings as Winnie-the-Pooh, Tigger and Beaver
 Travis Oates as Piglet
 Peter Cullen as Eeyore
 Ken Sansom as Rabbit
 Kath Soucie as Kanga
 Max Burkholder as Roo
 Oliver Dillon as Lumpy
 Tara Strong  as Porcupine
 Mark Hamill as Turtle
 Brenda Blethyn as Mama Heffalump

Soundtrack
The soundtrack was released on April 10, 2009, with 12 songs, three of these being instrumental tracks. , the soundtrack is available on iTunes Store.
"One Big Happy Family" (performed by the cast)
"A Few Simple Rules" (performed by Rabbit and the cast)
"Super Sleuths Theme" (instrumental)
"Bouncin" (performed by Tigger and ensemble)
"The Grass is Greener" (performed by Tigger and Rabbit)
"The Password Song" (performed by Tigger and Beaver)
"Underneath the Same Sky" (performed by Pooh with Andy Sturmer)
"Think, Think, Think" (instrumental)
"The Question Song" (instrumental)
"One Big Happy Family (Reprise)" (performed by the cast)
"Together Again (End Credits Theme)" (performed by Susanna Benn)
"Underneath the Same Sky (Extended Version)" (performed by Kenny Loggins)

Reception 
Emily Ashby of Common Sense Media gave the film four out of five stars, saying: "Catchy music, great morals, and endearing characters parents and kids can relate to make this movie one for the masses."

Conversely, Kelvin Cedeno of DVDizzy gave the film a mixed review, saying: "Diehard fans may want to pick it up, but everyone else interested can simply catch an airing of it on Playhouse Disney when it inevitably goes there."

The film was released on DVD on April 7, 2009; by the end of 2009 it had grossed $308,200 in home media sales.

References

External links

2009 films
2009 computer-animated films
2009 direct-to-video films
2000s American animated films
Winnie-the-Pooh films
American children's animated films
American computer-animated films
Disney direct-to-video animated films
Direct-to-video sequel films
Winnie the Pooh (franchise)
Films scored by Andy Sturmer
Disney Television Animation films
2000s English-language films